In mathematics, the hypograph or subgraph of a function  is the set of points lying on or below its graph. 
A related definition is that of such a function's epigraph, which is the set of points on or above the function's graph. 

Definition 

Similarly, the set of points on or above the function is its epigraph. 

The  is the hypograph with the graph removed:

Properties 

The hypograph of a function  is empty if and only if  is identically equal to negative infinity.

A function is concave if and only if its hypograph is a convex set. The hypograph of a real affine function  is a halfspace in  

A function is upper semicontinuous if and only if its hypograph is closed.

See also

Citations

References

  

Mathematical analysis
Convex analysis